Songs for the Last View is the eighth album by Lacrimas Profundere, which was released on 27 June 2008 in mainland Europe, with a US/Canada release on 15 July.

Track listing
All Songs Written and Arranged By Lacrimas Profundere

Bonus Limited Edition Digipack Tracks
<li>"Burn"
<li>"The Beauty of Who You Are"
<li>"The Shadow I Once Kissed (2nd Version)"
<li>"Sweet Letter C"

Bonus DVD
Bonus DVD Includes

 Live Footage:
 "Intro" - :59
 "My Velvet Little Darkness" - 3:17
 "Again It's Over" - 3:29
 "Sweet Caroline" - 3:04 
 "Amber Girl" - 3:11
 "My Mescaline" - 4:55
 "For Bad Times" - 4:05
 "Should" - 3:54
 "To Love Here on Knees" - 3:02
 "Sarah Lou" - 4:09
 "One Hopes Evening" - 3:55
 "Ave End" - 5:07

Also Included:
 "A Pearl" Music Video - 3:11
 Trailer Songs For The Last View - 1:36
 Making of "A Pearl" - 4:12
 Tour Movie - 14:12

A special pre-order edition of the album is available through the band's website. This includes a DVD and four bonus songs.

"A Pearl" was the first single from the album and was released as a download on 27 June 2008. It also featured a non-album song called The Love That Doesn't Care. A video was released for A Pearl.

A special downloadable piano version of "Sarah Lou" was given out to pre-orders from Amazon and EMP.

Singles
 A Pearl
 "A Pearl" (Album Version) - 03:00	  
 "A Love That Doesn't Care" (Non-Album Track) - 03:47

 And God's Ocean
 "And God's Ocean" (Single Version) - 03:47	  
 "Sacrificial Lamb" (Acoustic Sad Version) - 04:31

Outtakes
Not appear in any Version of the album or singles

 "Adorer and Somebody" (Acoustic Version) - 3:32
 "Sarah Lou" (Piano Version)* - 4:11

Only Sarah Lou  is available for the Pre-order edition of Songs For The Last View

Personnel
Rob Vitacca: Vocals
Oliver Nicholas Schmid: Guitars
Tony Berger: Guitars
Christian Steiner: Keyboards, Synthesizers
Daniel Lechner: Bass
Willi Wurm: Drums, Percussion
Christopher Schmid: Backing vocals

Production
Recorded, Produced, Engineered and Mixed By John Fryer
Mastered By Roger Lian

External links
"Songs For The Last View" at discogs

Lacrimas Profundere albums
Napalm Records albums
2008 albums
Albums produced by John Fryer (producer)